Martin Atkins may refer to:

 Martin Atkins (born 1959), English drummer and session musician
 Marty Atkins (born 1969), former Australian rules footballer
 Martin Atkins (darts player, born 1965), English professional darts player
 Martin Atkins (darts player, born 1975), English professional darts player
 Martin Atkins (programmer)